Gaya College, Gaya (GCG) is an public state college located in Gaya, Bihar, India. Established in February 1944 during the British Raj, it is affiliated with Magadh University, Bodhgaya and is one of the prestigious colleges in Bihar. It was previously placed under Patna University between 1944 and 1951 and then Dr. B. R. Ambedkar Bihar University from 1952 until the establishment of Magadh University in 1962.

Degrees 
B.A. In all major subjects
B.Sc. In all major subjects
B.Com. In all major subjects
M.A. In all major subjects
M.Sc. In all major subjects
M.Com. In all major subjects
B.B.A.
B.C.A.
B.B.M.
M.B.A.
M.C.A.
Bio-Technology
Philosophy
Persian
 B.Ed

Facilities 
Hostels
Sports ground
Indoor Games
Sports Facility
Health Centre/Medical
Common Rooms for Teachers
Canteen for Students
Banking facilities- students can use atm in the campus
NCC
NSS

References 

Colleges affiliated to Magadh University
Universities and colleges in Bihar
Education in Gaya, India
Educational institutions established in 1944
1945 establishments in India